Belopashino is a rural locality (a village) in Lensky District, Arkhangelsk Oblast, Russia. The population was 235 as of 2012. There are 3 streets.

Geography 
Belopashino is located on the Vychegda River, 102 km southwest of Yarensk (the district's administrative centre) by road. Soyga is the nearest rural locality.

References 

Rural localities in Lensky District, Arkhangelsk Oblast